Shridham railway station is a railway station in Narsinghpur district, Madhya Pradesh. Its code is SRID. It serves Chhota Chhindwara town. The station consists of three platforms. Passenger, MEMU, Express, and Superfast trains halt here.

References

Railway stations in Narsinghpur district
Jabalpur railway division